NextGenTel is a Norwegian telecommunications company located in Bergen (HQ), Trondheim, Oslo, Stavanger, and Kristiansand. They offer ADSL, SHDSL, ADSL2+, VDSL2, IPTV, IP Telephony, mobilephone subscriptions, and WiMax solutions. They are, with 140,000 customers, Norway's third-largest Internet service provider (the largest being Telenor and Altibox).

The company was established on March 1, 2000, and delivers Internet and TV solutions (triple play) over fiber and wireless broadband to private households and housing associations.

NextGenTel was wholly owned by the Swedish-Finnish telecommunications company TeliaSonera until December 2012, when the company was acquired by Telio. Since 2019, NextGenTel has been a fully owned subsidiary of Telecom 3 Holding AS.

References

External links 

Customer web pages

Internet service providers of Norway
VoIP companies
Telecommunications companies established in 2000
Companies formerly listed on the Oslo Stock Exchange
Norwegian companies established in 2000